is a Japanese precision tools maker, especially for the semiconductor production industry.

The company makes dicing saws and laser saws to cut semiconductor silicon wafers and other materials; grinders to process silicon and compound semiconductor wafers to ultra-thin levels; polishing machines to remove the grinding damage layer from the wafer back-side and to increase chip strength.

History
The company was founded as Daiichi-Seitosho in May 1937, as an industrial abrasive wheel manufacturer.

After World War II Japan faced a construction boom which also helped DISCO to boost its sales. The company's grinder discs were in high demand from utility companies, which needed them to manufacture watt-meters.

In December 1968 the company developed and released an ultra-thin resinoid cutting wheel, Microncut. The wheel contained diamond powder and as a result it was capable of making sharp, precision cuts as demanded in the semiconductor manufacturing process. There were no cutting machines available in the market on which ultra-thin precision wheels could be mounted and run, DISCO decided to develop its own machine in 1975. The cutting machine, DAD-2h, received instant recognition from semiconductor companies, including Texas Instruments.

The company adopted the name of DISCO Corporation in May 1977, was listed with the Japan Securities Dealers' Association in October 1989, and entered the First Section of the Tokyo Stock Exchange in December 1999.

References

External links

Disco Corporation global website 
European Website 

Manufacturing companies of Japan
Equipment semiconductor companies
Companies based in Tokyo
Manufacturing companies established in 1937
Companies listed on the Tokyo Stock Exchange
Japanese brands
Japanese companies established in 1937